No. 550 Squadron RAF was a heavy bomber squadron of the Royal Air Force during World War II. Formed at RAF Waltham on 25 November 1943, 550 Squadron flew Avro Lancaster bombers as part of No. 1 Group RAF. In early 1944, the squadron was moved to RAF North Killingholme, Lincolnshire where it continued operations until May 1945, when it began dropping food over the Netherlands as a relief effort as part of Operation Manna. The squadron was disbanded on 31 October 1945. Today, a surviving Lancaster bomber continues to fly in the markings of BQ-B "Phantom of the Ruhr" EE139 from 550 squadron as part of the Battle of Britain Memorial Flight.

History

Operation Banquet
Before standing up as an operational bomber unit 550 Squadron was allocated to the Air Fighting Development Unit under 'Operation Banquet' anti-invasion plans.

Formation at RAF Waltham

No. 550 squadron was formed at RAF Waltham (near Grimsby), Lincolnshire on 25 November 1943 from 'C' Flight of 100 Squadron. Equipped with Avro Lancasters, they began operating in the same month, as part of No. 1 Group RAF. The squadron's commanding officer, until 17 May 1944, was Wing Commander James Johnson Bennett.  The squadron motto was "Per Ignem Vincimus",.
 
From RAF Waltham, 550 Squadron attacked Berlin on seven different occasions, and also participated in raids on Leipzig and Frankfurt.
On 26/27 November 1943, 8 of their Lancasters were dispatched to make bombing runs over Berlin; 7 succeeded, with the other failing to return after the mission.

RAF Killinghome
On 3 January 1944 the squadron was moved to RAF North Killingholme, Lincolnshire, where it continued operations.  550 flew their first
mission from North Killingholme on 14 January 1944 - 11 Lancasters participated in a raid on Brunswick.

550 grew in size to two flights and later to three. 550 Squadron would become one of the most efficient squadrons in Bomber Command, on a number of occasions reaching the top of the No. 1 Group RAF Group bombing league table. Losses were relatively low, as was the rate of aborted missions - a good indication of high morale.

From January 44 until 26 May 1945 the squadron adjutant was Christopher Walter Waitt, who had served with the Royal Flying Corps in WW1 and had been awarded the Military Medal.

A notable member was F/Sgt Brian Todd, wireless operator who flew 14 sorties in early 1944 with A Flight Commander S/Ldr Peter Nicholas. He later became a famous comedian as Bob Todd, playing the slapstick sidekick to Benny Hill.

On 5 June 1944 550 Squadron participated in the D-Day landings, as Lancaster LL811 J-Jig "Bad Penny II" was credited with dropping the first string of bombs at 11.34pm.

On 25 April 1945 550 Squadron flew their last combat mission of the war - 23 Lancasters participated in the Bombing of Obersalzberg.

During the course of the war, 550 Squadron completed 3,582 operational sorties with the Lancaster with the loss of 59 aircraft. The squadron dropped 16,195 tons of bombs.  Three of 550 Squadron's Lancaster bombers succeeded in flying more than 100 combat missions. These were BQ-F "Press on Regardless" ED905, BQ-V 'The Vulture Strikes' PA995, and - the most well known - BQ-B "Phantom of the Ruhr" EE139. The latter flew a total of 121 missions.

550 Squadron dropped food over the Netherlands as a relief effort as part of Operation Manna, which took place from 29 April to 7 May 1945.

After the war

Germany surrendered on 8 May 1945. 550 Squadron was disbanded at North Killingholme on 31 October 1945, the same day that North Killinghome closed.

Today, the Battle of Britain Memorial Flight Lancaster is painted in the colours of BQ-B "Phantom of the Ruhr" EE139.

Aircraft operated

Notable aircraft
Three of the Lancasters that flew with 550 Squadron managed to survive one hundred operations or more, and one nearly did so:

Squadron bases

References

Notes

Bibliography

External links

 History of No.'s 541–598 Squadrons at RAF Web
 550 Squadron and North Killingholme Association Official website
 550 Squadron Association
 Senior officers of 550 Squadron Retrieved 5 June 2019
 Fate of Lancaster NF963 from 550 Squadron Retrieved 7 June 2019

Bomber squadrons of the Royal Air Force in World War II
550 Squadron
Military units and formations established in 1943
Military units and formations disestablished in 1946